Monkerton is a proposed railway station in the hamlet of Monkerton, near Exeter, Devon, England, and is proposed as part of the "Devon Metro" plans. It would be built at a later date than the other proposed stations and is planned to be located between Polsloe Bridge and Digby & Sowton stations.

References

 

Proposed railway stations in England
Transport in Exeter